Jonas Høgh-Christensen (born 21 May 1981) is a Danish sailor, winner of the Finn Gold Cup in 2009. He has represented Denmark in the Finn class at the 2004, 2008 and 2012 Summer Olympics at which he won the silver medal, narrowly missing out on the gold to British sailor Sir Ben Ainslie, who that day became the first person to win medals in five different Olympic Games in sailing, surpassing Danish Sailor Paul Elvstrøm who won four gold medals (but no silver).

References

External links
 
 
 

Danish male sailors (sport)
1981 births
Living people
Olympic sailors of Denmark
Olympic medalists in sailing
Olympic silver medalists for Denmark
Sailors at the 2004 Summer Olympics – Finn
Sailors at the 2008 Summer Olympics – Finn
Sailors at the 2012 Summer Olympics – Finn
Sailors at the 2016 Summer Olympics – Finn
Medalists at the 2012 Summer Olympics
Finn class world champions
World champions in sailing for Denmark